A mezzanine is an intermediate floor between main floors of a building. 

Mezzanine may also refer to:

Art, entertainment, and media
 Mezzanine (album), a 1998 album by Massive Attack
 The Mezzanine, a 1988 novel by Nicholson Baker

Business
 Mezzanine assets, digital assets created in an intermediate step, especially in the video and broadcast industry
 Mezzanine capital, a form of unsecured company financing; also "mezzanine fund": a fund combining bonds or debt-like instruments with stocks or equity

Technology
 Mezzanine (CMS), a content management system
 Advanced Mezzanine Card, a specification of printed circuit boards
 Mezzanine, a thin sheet of plastic used to insulate different parts of circuitry from each other in cramped environments, such as laptop interiors
 Mezzanine board, or daughterboard, an extension of a motherboard
 PCI Mezzanine Card, a specification of printed circuit boards with a PCI bus